The Idol Dancer is a 1920 American silent South Seas drama film produced and directed by D. W. Griffith. It stars Richard Barthelmess and Clarine Seymour in her final film role. Seymour was a young actress Griffith was grooming for stardom. She died of pneumonia shortly after emergency surgery for an intestinal blockage on April 24, 1920, less than a month after the film premiered.

The film is based on the story "Blood of the Covenants" by Gordon Ray Young. The scenario was written by Stanner E. V. Taylor.

Plot
Mary (Seymour) is the daughter of a French man and a Javanese mother and enjoys dancing. She has two lovers, one being a beachcomber (Barthelmess) who was tossed off a passing ship for failing to work and desires only to drink gin. The other is a sickly young American (Hale) who has come to the island in hope of regaining his health and is staying with his missionary uncle (MacQuarrie) and his wife (Bruce). Natives from a neighboring island attack. The beachcomber reforms and Mary comes to love him.

Cast
Richard Barthelmess as Dan McGuire, beachcomber
Clarine Seymour as Mary
Creighton Hale as Walter Kincaid
George MacQuarrie as Reverend Franklyn Blythe
Kate Bruce as Mrs. Blythe
Porter Strong as Reverend Peter
Anders Randolf as The Blackbirder
Walter James as Chief Wando
Thomas Carr as Donald Blythe
Herbert Sutch as Old Thomas
Adolph Lestina as Black Slave
Ben Grauer as Native Boy
Walter Kolomoku as Native Musician
Florence Short as Pansy

Production
Griffith filmed exteriors for The Idol Dancer simultaneously with The Love Flower (1920), in Fort Lauderdale, Florida, and Nassau, Bahamas in December 1919.

Status
A 35mm print of the film is preserved by the Cohen Media Group. 16mm prints of the film are held in private collections.

References

External links

Stills at moviessilently.com
Southseascinema.org

1920 films
1920 drama films
Silent American drama films
American silent feature films
American black-and-white films
Films directed by D. W. Griffith
Films shot in the Bahamas
Films shot in Florida
First National Pictures films
1920s American films